The Chapacuran languages are a nearly extinct Native American language family of South America. Almost all Chapacuran languages are extinct, and the four that are extant are moribund. They are spoken in Rondônia in the southern Amazon Basin of Brazil and in northern Bolivia. 

According to Kaufman (1990), the Chapacuran family could be related to the extinct Wamo language.

Languages

Angenot (1997)
List of Chapacuran languages from Angenot (1997):

Spoken in Brazil:
Torá
Urupá
Jarú
Jamará
Oro Win
Wariʼ (Pakaas Novos)
Tapoaya
Kutiana
Matáwa (Matáma)
Kumana (Cautario)
Uomo
Urunamakan
Kujuna
Pawumwa-Wanyam
Abitana-Wanyam
Kabishi-Wanyam
Miguelenho-Wanyam

Spoken in Bolivia:
Moré (Iten)
Muré
Itoreauhip
Rokorona
Herisobokono
Chapakura (Huachi, Tapakura)
Kitemoka (Kitemo)
Napeka (Nape)
Kusikia-Manasi

Birchall (2013)
Birchall et al. (2013) classify the dozen known Chapacuran languages as follows:

Chapacuran
Kitemoka–Tapakura
Chapacura †
Quitemo †
Moreic–Waric
Moreic–Tor
Nuclear More
Itene (90 speakers)
Cumana (3 speakers)
Torá †
Waric
Urupa–Yaru:
Urupa †
Yaru †
Wanham–Wari–Oro Win
Wanham †
Wari–Oro Win
Oro Win (5 speakers)
Wari' (2,700 speakers)
(position unclear) Napeca (Nape) †
(position unclear) Rocorona (Ocorono) †

All languages are rather closely related. 

Extinct languages for which Loukotka says 'nothing' is known, but which may have been Chapacuran, include Cujuna, Mataua, Urunumaca, and Herisobocono. Similarities with Mure appear to be loans.

Birchall, Dunn & Greenhill (2016)
Birchall, Dunn & Greenhill (2016) give the following phylogenetic tree of Chapacuran, based on a computational phylogenetic analysis.

Language contact
Jolkesky (2016) notes that there are lexical similarities with the Irantxe, Puinave-Kak, and Arawa language families due to contact.

Varieties
Below is a full list of Chapacuran language varieties listed by Loukotka (1968), including names of unattested varieties.

Chapacura / Huachi / Tapacura - extinct language once spoken on the Blanco River and around Lake Chitiopa, Santa Cruz province, Bolivia.
Irene / Moré - spoken on the Guaporé River, Azul River, and Mamoré River, Beni province, Bolivia.
Itoreauhip - spoken between the Guaporé River and Azul River in Bolivia.
Quitemo - once spoken on the Uruvaito River, Santa Cruz province, Bolivia.
Nape - once spoken in the same country on Lake Chitiopa.
Mure - once spoken on the San Martín River in Bolivia.
Rocorona - once spoken on the San Martín River.
Herisebocon - once spoken on the Rapulo River near the old mission of San Borja, Bolivia. (Unattested.)
Wañám / Huanyam / Pawumwa - spoken between the São Miguel River and São Domingo River, territory of Rondônia, Brazil.
Abitana - spoken as a dialect of the Wañám language at the sources of the São Miguel River, Brazil.
Kumana / Cautario - spoken between the Guaporé River and Cautario River, Rondônia.
Pacahanovo / Uari Wayõ - spoken on the Pacaás Novos River, Rondônia.
Kabixi - spoken between the São Miguel River and Preto River, Rondônia, now perhaps extinct.
Mataua - spoken in the western area of the Cautario River. (Unattested.)
Urunamacan - spoken to the north of the Wañám tribe, Rondônia, Brazil. (Unattested.)
Uómo / Miguelheno - spoken on the São Miguel River. (Unattested.)
Tapoaya - spoken by an unknown tribe at the sources of the Cautario River. (Unattested.)
Cujuna - spoken by a very little known tribe, now perhaps extinct, to the north of the Kumaná tribe. (Unattested.)
Urupá / Ituarupa - spoken on the Urupá River, Rondônia.
Yarú - spoken by a few families on the Jaru River.
Yamarú - extinct language once spoken on the Jamari River. (Unattested.)
Torá / Tura - formerly spoken on the Marmelos River and Paricá River, state of Amazonas; now by a few individuals on the Posta Cabeça d'anta, state of Amazonas.

Vocabulary
Loukotka (1968) lists the following basic vocabulary items for the Chapacuran languages.

Proto-language

Below are Proto-Chapacuran (Proto-Chapakura) reconstructions from the Diachronic Atlas of Comparative Linguistics (DiACL) online, cited from Angenot de Lima (1997). English glosses are from DiACL, and the original Portuguese glosses are from Angenot de Lima (1997). For the full list of original Portuguese glosses, see the corresponding Portuguese article.

{| class="wikitable sortable" style="font-size: 85%"
! Proto-Chapacuran !! English gloss !! Portuguese gloss !! Scientific name
|-
| *haɾam || to button ||  || 
|-
| *hoɾam || chin ||  || 
|-
| *ja: || to say, to speak ||  || 
|-
| *jaw || pillar, to grind with a stone ||  || 
|-
| *jaʔ || to bathe ||  || 
|-
| *jikat || penis ||  || 
|-
| *jowin || monkey species || macaco-prego || Sapajus
|-
| *ju: || to keep secret || seguir às escondidas || 
|-
| *juk || to push, to remove ||  || 
|-
| *kamaɲʔ || bland, without salt ||  || 
|-
| *kap || caterpillar species ||  || 
|-
| *kapam || pamonha (traditional food) ||  || 
|-
| *kaɾaʔ/*hwaɾaʔ || large, fat ||  || 
|-
| *kat, *kawʔ || river dolphin ||  || 
|-
| *kat, *ɾat || to yawn ||  || 
|-
| *katim || foot ||  || 
|-
| *katinʔ || large tick ||  || 
|-
| *katʃak/*katʃok || to tickle, tickling ||  || 
|-
| *katʃin || pineapple ||  || 
|-
| *kawʔ || to eat ||  || 
|-
| *kawa: || tree species || árvore-rochinha || 
|-
| *kawa: || kind of small arrow, used by children playing ||  || 
|-
| *kawit || parrot species || papagaio-curica || 
|-
| *kedzek || to lick ||  || 
|-
| *kenum || cocoa ||  || 
|-
| *kijiʔ || to descend, to lower ||  || 
|-
| *kinam || jaguar, dog ||  || 
|-
| *kipun || tail ||  || 
|-
| *kipwin || (to be) cold ||  || 
|-
| *kitam || bridge, jirau grill || ponte, grelha para moquear || 
|-
| *kiw || to bite, to chew ||  || 
|-
| *kiwoʔ || arrow (generic) ||  || 
|-
| *koki: || piranha ||  || 
|-
| *kom || to sing (people) ||  || 
|-
| *komeN || sun ||  || 
|-
| *koɾa: || paddle ||  || 
|-
| *koɾan || palm species || palmeira-carundaí || buriti?
|-
| *kotem || red, ripe ||  || 
|-
| *kotok/*koɾok || to knock down fruits by beating the tree ||  || 
|-
| *kɾam || elbow, joint ||  || 
|-
| *kɾan || ant species || formiga-saúva || Atta
|-
| *kɾik || to see, to observe, to look ||  || 
|-
| *kɾom || to enter, inside ||  || 
|-
| *kuk || to pull, to drag ||  || 
|-
| *kunʔ || tree species || árvore-cachimbeira, jequitibá-vermelho; sal || Cariniana rubra
|-
| *kunu: || to stink, bad smell ||  || 
|-
| *kut || to pick, to catch ||  || 
|-
| *kwaɾaʔ || common armadillo ||  || 
|-
| *ma(w) || to go ||  || 
|-
| *madzan || kind of yam || batata-cará || 
|-
| *makiʔ || to come, to arrive ||  || 
|-
| *manaʔ || anger, brave ||  || 
|-
| *mapak || corn ||  || 
|-
| *mapawʔ || club, baton ||  || 
|-
| *mapom || fat, grease ||  || 
|-
| *mapwip || kind of small bow ||  || 
|-
| *maɾam || to paint, to write ||  || 
|-
| *mawi: || to steal, thief ||  || 
|-
| *mawin || annatto (tree species), wood for making fire ||  || Bixa orellana
|-
| *mekuʔ || crab ||  || 
|-
| *mem || red, ripe ||  || 
|-
| *mikop || paca ||  || 
|-
| *mitʃem || black ||  || 
|-
| *mo: || to run ||  || 
|-
| *mokon || rope, cord, string, thread ||  || 
|-
| *mom || to swell because of illness, to have a tumor ||  || 
|-
| *moɾoʔ || flour ||  || 
|-
| *mowawʔ || tucumã palm larva || broca do tucumã || larva of Astrocaryum aculeatum
|-
| *mowin || pus, infection, tumour ||  || 
|-
| *muɾinʔ || swallow ||  || 
|-
| *mwijak || wild hog ||  || 
|-
| *n(e/o)n || to whistle with help from the hand ||  || 
|-
| *nak || to smell, to sniff ||  || 
|-
| *naɾan || pitch/tar (of jatobá tree); light || breu (de jatobá); luz || Hymenaea courbaril
|-
| *natan || face, front ||  || 
|-
| *nok || to hate, to reject ||  || 
|-
| *nok || to suckle ||  || 
|-
| *nopon || tree species || árvore-itaúba || Mezilaurus itauba
|-
| *pa: || to beat, to slap ||  || 
|-
| *padzaw || pubic hair ||  || 
|-
| *pakaʔ || red, ripe ||  || 
|-
| *pana: || tree (generic), wood, log ||  || 
|-
| *papat || bamboo species, kind of arrow, bomboo knife || taquara (esp.); flecha (esp.); faca de bambu || 
|-
| *papop || wind ||  || 
|-
| *paɾV: || bow (generic) ||  || 
|-
| *patiʔ || animal (generic), fish ||  || 
|-
| *pawʔ || to tie (up) ||  || 
|-
| *paʔ || to kill, to hunt, to beat to death ||  || 
|-
| *pijeʔ || newborn child ||  || 
|-
| *pikot || giant armadillo || tatu gigante || 
|-
| *pipon || bird species || cujubim || Pipile cujubi
|-
| *piɾamʔ || squirrel || quoati-puru, esquilo || 
|-
| *pitʃak || to scratch, to itch ||  || 
|-
| *pitʃi: || horn ||  || 
|-
| *piwan || tarantula || aranha caranguejeira || 
|-
| *piʔ || to dance ||  || 
|-
| *pok || thigh, upper leg ||  || 
|-
| *pon || to fart ||  || 
|-
| *pot || to pull out ||  || 
|-
| *pot || to get, to tear, to extract ||  || 
|-
| *potʃ || to cook; to spit || cozinhar; cuspir || 
|-
| *poʔ || to wake up, to rouse ||  || 
|-
| *pɾin || parakeet ||  || 
|-
| *pɾu: || to kill, to hit a target with an arrow ||  || 
|-
| *pu: || to blow, to light a fire ||  || 
|-
| *puɾek || to miss the target with an arrow ||  || 
|-
| *pwe: || to sit ||  || 
|-
| *pwikun || stone, rock ||  || 
|-
| *pwin || to leave behind ||  || 
|-
| *pwiɾan || boa ||  || 
|-
| *pwit || to break, to cut, to extract, to unrip ||  || 
|-
| *pwiti: || large horsefly ||  || 
|-
| *pwitsi: || palm species || palmeira-totai || Acrocomia aculeata subsp. totai
|-
| *pwitsop || porcupine, hedgehog ||  || 
|-
| *pwiw || flower ||  || 
|-
| *ɾi:(tan) || banana (generic) ||  || 
|-
| *tajin || charcoal ||  || 
|-
| *takat || wax (honey, ear, for arrow, etc.) ||  || 
|-
| *takawʔ || kind of fish || peixe-cará || Geophagus brasiliensis
|-
| *takiʔ || to fly, to leave flying ||  || 
|-
| *tan || leaf, one ||  || 
|-
| *tapan || monkey species || macaco-saguim || Callitrichidae; Callithrix jacchus
|-
| *tapiw || agouti ||  || 
|-
| *tapot || straw, cover/roofing of house ||  || 
|-
| *tata: || father (1SG.POSS) ||  || 
|-
| *tataw || rope made of tree fibers; horn || envira (esp.); chifre || 
|-
| *tatsam || to laugh, to smile ||  || 
|-
| *tatʃiʔ || husband ||  || 
|-
| *tawan || lazy, sulky, disobedient ||  || 
|-
| *tawi: || bee (generic), honey ||  || 
|-
| *tawit || fence, surrounded ||  || 
|-
| *taʔ || to cut ||  || 
|-
| *tikat || to finish ||  || 
|-
| *tim || heart ||  || 
|-
| *tipan || arm ||  || 
|-
| *tipat || wing ||  || 
|-
| *tipoʔ || to follow a trail ||  || 
|-
| *titimʔ/*tiɾimʔ || to lie down ||  || 
|-
| *tok || to drink ||  || 
|-
| *tok || eye, grain, seed, stone ||  || 
|-
| *toke: || chestnut, Brazil nut ||  || 
|-
| *tom || to burn, black ||  || 
|-
| *tomiʔ || to say, to speak ||  || 
|-
| *ton || to knock down fruits by beating the tree ||  || 
|-
| *top || to explode, to break corn ||  || 
|-
| *topak || mouth, lips, to speak ||  || 
|-
| *topan || skin, peel, bark ||  || 
|-
| *topop || basket (generic) ||  || 
|-
| *toɾo: || to swell, to ferment, to cause swelling ||  || 
|-
| *totʃam || clay ||  || 
|-
| *totʃik || bee species, honey || abelha-lambeolho; seu mel || Leurotrigona muelleri
|-
| *towa: || turtle, tortoise; rubber cylinder (?) || tartaruga, tracaja, jabuti; tambor de caucho || 
|-
| *towan || kind of fruit || fruta-murisi || Byrsonima crassifolia
|-
| *towaʔ || white, bright color, daybreak/dawn ||  || 
|-
| *towin || parrot species || papagaio-curica || 
|-
| *toʔ || to beat, to open, to crack, to cut ||  || 
|-
| *tɾakom || bamboo, taboca (bamboo species) || bambu; taboca || Guadua weberbaueri
|-
| *tɾakop || fermented drink ||  || 
|-
| *tɾamaʔ || man ||  || 
|-
| *tɾamwin || red macaw ||  || 
|-
| *tɾan tɾan || guan bird || jacu || Penelope
|-
| *tɾapo: || white hair ||  || 
|-
| *tɾawan || liver; palm species, fish species || fígado; palmeira-patua; patua; surubim || Pimelodidae
|-
| *tɾik || coal, ember ||  || 
|-
| *tɾot || aricuri palm leaf ||  || Syagrus coronata
|-
| *tʃak || to suck on a fruit ||  || 
|-
| *tʃek || day ||  || 
|-
| *tʃijat || net ||  || 
|-
| *tʃik || one ||  || 
|-
| *tʃikinʔ || nail, claw; traíra (fish species) || unha, garra; traíra (peixe) || Erythrinidae
|-
| *tʃin || to throw ||  || 
|-
| *tʃitot || country, to plant ||  || 
|-
| *tʃiw || (to be) cold ||  || 
|-
| *tʃok || to suck "noisily", to make a "sucking" sound ||  || 
|-
| *tʃom || to step; to insist || pisar, bater o pé || 
|-
| *tʃopin || to spit ||  || 
|-
| *tʃoraw || swallow ||  || 
|-
| *tʃowiʔ || rain, winter ||  || 
|-
| *tʃup || to kiss "noisily" ||  || 
|-
| *tun || hair, coat ||  || 
|-
| *tut || to walk ||  || 
|-
| *wak || to add, to pile up ||  || 
|-
| *waki: || toad species ||  || 
|-
| *wan || to copulate, to have sex ||  || 
|-
| *wana: || way, path, road ||  || 
|-
| *waɲam || Indian of enemy tribe ||  || 
|-
| *waɾak || sap, sperm, vaginal secretion ||  || 
|-
| *watam || kind of fruit ||  || 
|-
| *watʃik || common opossum || mucura || Didelphis marsupialis
|-
| *wet || to marry ||  || 
|-
| *weʔ || to vomit ||  || 
|-
| *wijak || to scrape with a knife ||  || 
|-
| *wijam || small ||  || 
|-
| *wina: || to raise an animal, to tame/domesticate ||  || 
|-
| *wina: || grandson ||  || 
|-
| *winimʔ || to wait, to except ||  || 
|-
| *witʃiʔ || to roast on coal/ember ||  || 
|-
| *ʔajiʔ || older brother ||  || 
|-
| *ʔaka: || to sing (of bird), to cackle, to cry ||  || 
|-
| *ʔakom || water; river; rain ||  || 
|-
| *ʔakop || manioc, cassava ||  || 
|-
| *ʔam || edge, margin ||  || 
|-
| *ʔamiʔ || to give ||  || 
|-
| *ʔamon || excrements, feces, intestines, belly ||  || 
|-
| *ʔamwi: || very, much ||  || 
|-
| *ʔaɲ || to cry ||  || 
|-
| *ʔanin || younger sister ||  || 
|-
| *ʔapa: || palm species || palmeira-marayau || Bactris major
|-
| *ʔapam || shoulder ||  || 
|-
| *ʔapan || kind of fruit ||  || 
|-
| *ʔapaʔ || maternal grandmother ||  || 
|-
| *ʔapi: || thorn, needle, hook ||  || 
|-
| *ʔapi: || father-in-law ||  || 
|-
| *ʔapiʔ || to finish ||  || 
|-
| *ʔapo: || uncle (aunt's husband) ||  || 
|-
| *ʔapop || caiman || jacaré || 
|-
| *ʔatat || bone, leg ||  || 
|-
| *ʔataw/*ʔaɾaw || back, shoulders ||  || 
|-
| *ʔatin || younger brother ||  || 
|-
| *ʔatɾim || house, traditional village (maloca) ||  || 
|-
| *ʔatʃaʔ || younger sibling ||  || 
|-
| *ʔatʃem || to sneeze ||  || 
|-
| *ʔaw || to spill liquid, to bleed, to leak, to drain, to drip ||  || 
|-
| *ʔawan || bitter ||  || 
|-
| *ʔawan || tree species with venomous bark ||  || 
|-
| *ʔawan || pig, hog, capybara ||  || 
|-
| *ʔawi: || good, beautiful, tasty ||  || 
|-
| *ʔawik || blood ||  || 
|-
| *ʔawin || sky, height, to charge upwards ||  || 
|-
| *ʔawom || cotton; clothes; dove/pigeon species || algodão; roupa; pomba (esp.) || 
|-
| *ʔawum || 2SG ||  || 
|-
| *ʔenem || brother-in-law (sister's husband) ||  || 
|-
| *ʔep || pillar, to grind with a stone ||  || 
|-
| *ʔeɾum || trumpeter (bird species) || jacamim || Psophia
|-
| *ʔew || burn ||  || 
|-
| *ʔewu: || toucan ||  || 
|-
| *ʔihwam || fish (generic) ||  || 
|-
| *ʔijat || tooth, beak ||  || 
|-
| *ʔijaʔ || vessel made of palm || vasilha feita de cacho de palmeira || 
|-
| *ʔijewʔ || paternal grandfather ||  || 
|-
| *ʔiji: || palm species || palmeira-bacaba || Oenocarpus bacaba
|-
| *ʔijinʔ || fear, to fear ||  || 
|-
| *ʔijoʔ || to put out, to erase ||  || 
|-
| *ʔikan || kind of mosquito || mosquito-catoqui || 
|-
| *ʔikat || medicine man, sorcerer ||  || 
|-
| *ʔikat || to break ||  || 
|-
| *ʔikim || chest, thorax ||  || 
|-
| *ʔikit || knife, iron instrument ||  || 
|-
| *ʔiman || hole, vagina ||  || 
|-
| *ʔimiʔ || kind of mosquito or fly || pium, borrachudo || Simuliidae
|-
| *ʔimwinʔ || tapir ||  || 
|-
| *ʔimwiʔ || to die, dead ||  || 
|-
| *ʔinamʔ || pregnant ||  || 
|-
| *ʔinawʔ || bat ||  || 
|-
| *ʔinaʔ || mother ||  || 
|-
| *ʔipa: || to open (eyes, door) ||  || 
|-
| *ʔipan || to fall, to be born ||  || 
|-
| *ʔipik || latex, rubber || seringa; borracha || 
|-
| *ʔipwik || anteater species || tamanduá-mirim || Tamandua tetradactyla
|-
| *ʔiɾam || açaí palm || palmeira-açai || 
|-
| *ʔiɾiʔ || (to be) right, truth ||  || 
|-
| *ʔit || body ||  || 
|-
| *ʔitak || to swallow ||  || 
|-
| *ʔitaʔ/*ʔiɾaʔ || to urinate ||  || 
|-
| *ʔite: || father (1SG.POSS) ||  || 
|-
| *ʔitʃe: || fire, firewood ||  || 
|-
| *ʔitsim || night ||  || 
|-
| *ʔitʃin || centipede, millipede ||  || 
|-
| *ʔiwʔ || louse ||  || 
|-
| *ʔiwan || to get home ||  || 
|-
| *ʔiwi: || mat ||  || 
|-
| *ʔiwiʔ || smoke ||  || 
|-
| *ʔodzip || palm species || palmeira-najá || Attalea maripa
|-
| *ʔojam || spirit, soul of a corpse ||  || 
|-
| *ʔojop || pacu (fish species) ||  || 
|-
| *ʔokin || scorpion ||  || 
|-
| *ʔokon || palm species || palmeira-real / buriti || Mauritia flexuosa
|-
| *ʔomaʔ || to live, to have, to exist ||  || 
|-
| *ʔomi: || scrubland, bush, firm land ||  || 
|-
| *ʔon || to whistle without help from the hand ||  || 
|-
| *ʔonaɲ || palm species || palmeira-buruburu || Astrocaryum murumuru
|-
| *ʔonok || navel, belly button ||  || 
|-
| *ʔop || to dance ||  || 
|-
| *ʔopaʔ || bagre (fish species) || bagre || 
|-
| *ʔopi: || woodworm/beetle species || caruncho rola-bosta; besouro (esp.) || 
|-
| *ʔopot || kind of liana used for binding || cipó-ambé, usado para amarrar || 
|-
| *ʔoɾam || cheek ||  || 
|-
| *ʔorawʔ || mushroom species ||  || 
|-
| *ʔoro: || people of, clan of, kind of ||  || 
|-
| *ʔoɾom || gourd, calabash ||  || 
|-
| *ʔoɾot || to break out (2nd permanent tooth of a child) ||  || 
|-
| *ʔotin || curassow (bird species) || mutum || Cracidae
|-
| *ʔoto: || gourd, calabash ||  || 
|-
| *ʔotsiw || monkey species || macaco-de-cheiro amarelo || Saimiri
|-
| *ʔowam || kind of fish || peixe-jeju || Hoplerythrinus unitaeniatus
|-
| *ʔowit || wart ||  || 
|-
| *ʔoβi: || anum (bird species) ||  || Crotophaga
|-
| *ʔukun || flesh (of the body), body ||  || 
|-
| *ʔum || hand ||  || 
|-
| *ʔumwe: || bird (generic) ||  || 
|-
| *ʔupwek || head ||  || 
|-
| *ʔupweɲ || to sleep ||  || 
|-
| *ʔuɾin || ant species || formiga-da-castanha || 
|-
| *ʔutuɾ || nose ||  || 
|-
| *ʔutut || urine ||  || 
|-
| *ʔuwe: || older sister ||  || 
|-
| *ʔuwew || paternal grandmother ||  || 
|-
| *ʔuwit || name ||  || 
|-
| *ʔuʔ || ant species || formiga-saraça || 
|}

Notes and references

 
Language families
Indigenous languages of Western Amazonia
Languages of Brazil
Languages of Bolivia